Pras was a town of Phthiotis in ancient Thessaly, a little south of Pharsalus. Agesilaus, on his return from Asia in 394 BCE, gained a victory over the Thessalian cavalry nearby. The Thessalians, after their defeat, took refuge on Mount Narthacium, between which and Pras, Agesilaus set up a trophy. On the following day he crossed the mountains of the Achaean Phthiotis.

Its site is unlocated.

References

Populated places in ancient Thessaly
Former populated places in Greece
Achaea Phthiotis
Lost ancient cities and towns